Cristian Sanavia (born February 27, 1975) is an Italian former professional boxer who competed from 1997 to 2014. He held the WBC super middleweight title in 2004.

Professional career

Sanavia turned pro in 1997 and captured the WBC Super Middleweight Title in 2004 with an upset win over Markus Beyer by split decision. He lost the title in a rematch with Beyer via 6th round KO. Sanavia has not fought for another major title since the rematch with Beyer. He announced his retirement in 2012 but has fought since then.

Professional boxing record

See also
List of world super-middleweight boxing champions

References

External links

 

|-

1975 births
Living people
Italian male boxers
Sportspeople from Padua
Middleweight boxers
World super-middleweight boxing champions
European Boxing Union champions
World Boxing Council champions
Mediterranean Games bronze medalists for Italy
Mediterranean Games medalists in boxing
Competitors at the 1997 Mediterranean Games